Jimmy Massey (December 1, 1929 – August 21, 2015) was a NASCAR Grand National driver who competed in 51 races (along with the 1955 Southern 500).

Career summary
Out of these 51 races, there has been twelve finishes in the top-five and twenty-eight finishes in the top ten. Massey's total career earnings was considered to be $14,974 ($ when adjusted for inflation). By the end of the 1964 season, Jimmy ends up leading 33 laps and finishing one position better on average than he started. The majority of his races were done in Chevrolet automobiles.

Massey's best accomplishments were on restrictor plate tracks where he finished an average of 10th place while his poorest races were held on tri-oval intermediate tracks; where 27th place would become his average.

References

External links
 

1929 births
2015 deaths
NASCAR drivers
People from Mebane, North Carolina
Racing drivers from North Carolina